The 2011 Tallahassee Tennis Challenger was a professional tennis tournament played on outdoor hard courts. It was the third edition of the tournament which was part of the 2011 ATP Challenger Tour. It took place in the Forestmeadows Tennis Complex in Tallahassee, United States between 11 and 16 April 2011.

ATP entrants

Seeds

 Rankings are as of April 4, 2011.

Other entrants
The following players received wildcards into the singles main draw:
  James Blake
  Andrea Collarini
  Denis Kudla
  Michael Shabaz

The following players received entry from the qualifying draw:
  Wayne Odesnik
  Greg Ouellette
  Vasek Pospisil
  Daniel Yoo
  Nicholas Monroe (as a Lucky loser)
  Joseph Sirianni (as a Lucky loser)

Champions

Singles

 Donald Young def.  Wayne Odesnik, 6–4, 3–6, 6–3

Doubles

 Vasek Pospisil /  Bobby Reynolds def.  Go Soeda /  James Ward, 6–2, 6–4

References
Official Website
ITF search
ATP official site

Tallahassee Tennis Challenger
Hard court tennis tournaments in the United States
Tallahassee Tennis Challenger
Tallahassee Tennis